The Last Invisible Boy is a 2008 children's novel by Evan Kuhlman. The book was first published in hardback on October 21, 2008 through Atheneum Books for Young Readers. The work follows Finn, a young boy dealing with the sudden death of his father.

Synopsis
Finn Garret is slowly turning invisible. After the sudden death of his beloved father, Finn notices that his skin and hair are growing steadily paler, which convinces him that he is on his way to becoming completely invisible. His mother has taken Finn to several doctors, who believe that his new appearance is due to stress and grief over the family's recent loss. Matters are made worse when Finn returns to school and is cruelly mocked for his appearance by his classmates. But as time goes on, Finn finds that his "invisibility" might not be as permanent and inevitable as he might believe it to be.

Reception
Critical reception has been positive. Publishers Weekly and Booklist both gave positive reviews for The Last Invisible Boy, and Publishers Weekly commented "Precise in his metaphors and his characterizations, Kuhlman delivers a study in coping with loss that middle-schoolers will want to absorb and empathize with." Kirkus Reviews also gave the book praise, as they felt that Kuhlman's treatment of Finn's grief was well written and believable.

Awards
Deutscher Jugendliteraturpreis for Kinderbuch (2011, nomination)

References

External links
Official publisher's site

2008 American novels
American children's novels
Fiction about invisibility
2008 children's books
Atheneum Books books